Count Franz-Ludwig Schenk von Stauffenberg (born 4 May 1938) is a German lawyer and politician from the CSU. He was a member of the Bundestag from 1976 to 1987 and of the European Parliament from 1984 to 1992. He is the son of World War II colonel and resistance leader Claus von Stauffenberg.

Family
Franz-Ludwig Gustav Schenk Graf von Stauffenberg is the third son of Claus Schenk Graf von Stauffenberg and Nina Schenk Gräfin von Stauffenberg. He married Elisabeth Freiin von und zu Guttenberg, born in Pähl on 5 July 1944, on 25 May 1965 in Guttenberg.

Children
The Stauffenbergs have four children:
 
 Hans Caspar Erwein Claus Maria Schenk, Graf von Stauffenberg (b. München, 3 March 1966), married civilly at Kirchlauter on 16 August 1995 and religiously at Maria-Thann on 2 September 1995 to S.E.H. Maria Josefa Gabriele Philippa Gräfin von Waldburg zu Zeil und Hohenems (b. Ravensburg, 29 August 1964), and has four children:
 Maximilian Karl Christian Maria Schenk, Graf von Stauffenberg (b. Frankfurt am Main, 15 January 1997)
 Lioba Schenk, Gräfin von Stauffenberg (b. Frankfurt am Main, 18 July 1998)
 Nikolaus Schenk, Graf von Stauffenberg (b. Starnberg, 6 December 2000)
 Josef Schenk Graf von Stauffenberg (b. Starnberg, 21 July 2002).
 Valerie Sofie Schenk, Gräfin von Stauffenberg (b. Munich, 4 June 1968), married at Kirchlauter on 2 September 1990 Marcus Freiherr von Mauchenheim (b. Murnau, 31 October 1958), and has two sons:
 Felix Freiherr von Mauchenheim gennant Bechtolsheim (b. Dresden, 30 January 1992)
 Paul Freiherr von Mauchenheim gennant Bechtolsheim (b. Dresden, 15 May 1994)
 Maximilian Karl Schenk, Graf von Stauffenberg (b. Munich, 27 October 1970), married at Kirchlauter on 19 August 1995 Harriet von Randow (b. München, 27 November 1974), and has two children:
 Leopold Schenk, Graf von Stauffenberg (b. Munich, 30 July 1997)
 Antonia Schenk, Gräfin von Stauffenberg (b. Starnberg, 24 August 2001)
 Maria Nina Michaela Schenk, Gräfin von Stauffenberg (b. Bamberg, 2 September 1982), married at Kirchlauter on 23 September 2014 to Franz Graf von und zu Westerholt und Gysenberg

Early life
After his father's assassination attempt against Adolf Hitler failed on 20 July 1944, Stauffenberg was sent to a foster home in Bad Sachsa and given the new surname of Meister, as the Nazis viewed the name of Stauffenberg unacceptable, due to the prominence of that name in the assassination attempt. Franz-Ludwig's mother, two older brothers, and younger sister Valerie, as well as other relatives, were arrested under Nazi Sippenhaft (blood guilt) laws. He was educated at the Schule Schloss Salem and then qualified as a lawyer after passing his staatsexamen.

Political career
In 1994, in connection with the commemoration of the 50th anniversary of the 20 July plot, he demanded that communists, who had fought in the Red Army in the National Committee for a Free Germany should not be honored together with his father. According to Stauffenberg, Communists desired to replace the Nazi Party with another single-party dictatorship. This demand gained many prominent supporters, including then-Federal Defence Minister Volker Rühe.

Honours 
 1984: Bayerischer Verdienstorden (Bavarian Order of Merit)
 Knight of the Bavarian Royal Order of Saint George for the Defense of the Immaculate Conception

References

External links 
 European Parliament's MEP Archives
 
 

1938 births
Living people
Franz Ludwig
Counts of Germany
Members of the Bundestag for Bavaria
German anti-communists
Recipients of the Cross of the Order of Merit of the Federal Republic of Germany
Christian Social Union in Bavaria MEPs
MEPs for Germany 1984–1989
MEPs for Germany 1989–1994
German Roman Catholics
People from Bamberg
Members of the Bundestag for the Christian Social Union in Bavaria